.sr is the Internet country code top-level domain (ccTLD) for Suriname. This top-level domain is operated by Telesur, the local telecom company.

It is considered to be a generic top-level domain by Google.

See also
 Internet in Suriname
 ISO 3166-2:SR

References

External links
 IANA .sr whois information
 Telesur

Country code top-level domains
Communications in Suriname

sv:Toppdomän#S